The Rhode Island Steelers were a minor league American football team based in Pawtucket, Rhode Island. They began play in the Atlantic Coast Football League in 1966 as a minor league affiliate of the NFL's Pittsburgh Steelers. Within weeks of the team's formation was announced, they selected former Pittsburgh Steelers/Dallas Cowboys running back Ray Mathews as head coach.

The Steelers struggled both on and off the field. Early in the 1966 ACFL season the league provided financial assistance to the team to prevent them from leaving Pawtucket, where they never drew more than 3,000 fans for any home game. The team's final game was a 48-7 loss to the Wilmington Clippers on October 1 in front of just 591 spectators. The next week the team announced they were withdrawing from the ACFL due to financial difficulties, having lost five games and tied one.

Season-by-season

Further reading

References

Atlantic Coast Football League teams
Minor League Football Association teams
American football teams in Rhode Island
1966 establishments in Rhode Island
1966 disestablishments in Rhode Island
American football teams established in 1966